The M876 motorway is a motorway in Scotland. The motorway runs from Denny to Airth in the Falkirk council area, forming an approach road to the Kincardine Bridge.  It was opened in 1980.

It begins by turning off junction 8 (formerly junction 5 until 2011) of the M80 and bypasses Falkirk and Stenhousemuir. It is one of only three motorways in the UK which form a concurrency with another motorway, the M9 which it then leaves again and continues for  before becoming the A876.

The original Kincardine Bridge was supplemented in 2008 by a second bridge, (the Clackmannanshire Bridge) for traffic towards Alloa.  As part of the works, the terminal roundabout Bowtrees Roundabout was replaced with a grade separated junction, and the A876 beyond the junction has been upgraded to dual carriageway standard .

Junctions  
{| class="plainrowheaders wikitable"
|-
!scope=col|County
!scope=col|Location
!scope=col|mi
!scope=col|km
!scope=col|Junction
!scope=col|Destinations
!scope=col|Notes
|-
|rowspan="6"|Falkirk
|rowspan="2"|Denny
|0
|0
| bgcolor="ffdddd" |—
| bgcolor="ffdddd" |  - Glasgow, Cumbernauld
| bgcolor="ffdddd" |Eastbound entrance and Westbound exit only
|-
|2.0
|3.2
|1
|  - Denny, Falkirk
|
|-
|rowspan="2"|Falkirk
|3.6
|5.9
|2
|  - Stenhousemuir, Larbert; - Stirling
|
|-
|5.3
|8.5
| bgcolor="ddffdd" |—
| bgcolor="ddffdd" |  - Stirling
| bgcolor="ddffdd" |Eastbound entrance and Westbound exit only, begins multiplex with M9
|-
|rowspan="2"|
|6.2
|10.0
| bgcolor="ddffdd" |—
| bgcolor="ddffdd" |  - Grangemouth, Falkirk
| bgcolor="ddffdd" |End of multiplex with M9
|-
|7.6
|12.1
|3
|  - Airth, ; - Kincardine
|End of motorway; continues as A876

Coordinate list

See also 
List of motorways in the United Kingdom

References

External links 

 Scottish Roads Archive - the M876 Motorway
CBRD
Motorway Database – M876
Videos – M876
 Pathetic Motorways – M876
 The Motorway Archive – M876
 Upper Forth Crossing details – M876/A876

Motorways in Scotland
Transport in Falkirk (council area)